Jack A. Adams (August 3, 1922 – September 22, 2010) was an American engineering psychologist and professor at the University of Illinois at Urbana-Champaign.

He served in the United States Army during World War II, and received the Bronze Star Medal. Adams died in Falls Church, Virginia in September 2010 at the age of 88 following a battle with cancer.

References 

1922 births
2010 deaths
United States Army personnel of World War II
Deaths from cancer in Virginia
University of Illinois Urbana-Champaign faculty